The 2006 FIBA Africa Under-18 Championship for Women was the 9th FIBA Africa Under-18 Championship for Women, played under the rules of FIBA, the world governing body for basketball, and the FIBA Africa thereof. The tournament was hosted by Benin from 8 to 16 September 2006.

Mali defeated Ivory Coast 77-66 in the final to win their third title  with both winner and runner-up qualifying for the 2007 FIBA U19 Women's World Cup.

Participating teams

Squads

Schedule

Knockout stage
Championship bracket

Semifinals

Bronze medal match

Final

Final standings

Mali rosterAïssata Bore, Fanta Toure, Fatoumata Bagayoko, Fatoumata Traoré, Kadia Sacko, Kadiatou Coulibaly, Kama Dembélé, Minata Keita, Naignouma Coulibaly, Nassira Traoré, Ouleymatou Coulibaly, Sira Diakité, Coach:

Awards

All-Tournament Team

 Fanta Toure
 Catarina Eusébio
 Kani Kouyate
 Diane Mabibi
 Naignouma Coulibaly

Statistical Leaders

Individual Tournament Highs

Points

Rebounds

Assists

Steals

Blocks

Turnovers

2-point field goal percentage

3-point field goal percentage

Free throw percentage

Individual Game Highs

Team Tournament Highs

Points

Rebounds

Assists

Steals

Blocks

Turnovers

2-point field goal percentage

3-point field goal percentage

Free throw percentage

Team Game highs

See also
 2007 FIBA Africa Championship for Women

External links
Official Website

References

2006 FIBA Africa Under-18 Championship for Women
2006 FIBA Africa Under-18 Championship for Women
FIBA Africa Under-18 Championship for Women
2006 in youth sport
FIBA